Strategies Against Architecture '80–'83, also spelled 80–83 Strategies Against Architecture (German:80–83 Strategien gegen Architekturen), is a 1984 compilation album by the German industrial band Einstürzende Neubauten. It consists of material recorded from 1980 to 1983, and features roughly half of the band's debut 1981 LP Kollaps along with single-only tracks and live material. It was originally released on Mute Records and is currently being sold without authority by Rough Trade.

Track listing
 "Tanz Debil" - 3:20 (A Dance of Mental Illness)
 "Schmerzen hören" (Hören Mit Schmerzen) - 2:31 (Listen with Pain)
 "Mikroben" - 1:31 (Microbes)
 "Krieg in den Städten" - 3:44 (War in the Cities) (originally Steh auf Berlin)
 "Zum Tier machen" - 3:05 (Changing to Animal)
 "Draußen ist feindlich" - 0:48 (Outside is Hostile)
 "Stahlversion" - 5:35 (Steel Version)
 "Schwarz" - 4:16 (Black)
 "Negativ nein" - 2:23 (The Act of Double Negativism)
 "Kalte Sterne" - 4:11 (Black Hole Cold Stars)
 "Spaltung" - 2:25 (Split)
 "U-Haft Muzak" - 3:41 (Muzak for While on Remand)
 "Gestohlenes Band (ORF)" - 0:17 (Tape Stolen in ORF)
 "Schwarz (mutiert)" - 3:26 (Black (A Mutation))

Personnel
Einstürzende Neubauten
 Blixa Bargeld - lead vocals, guitars
 Mark Chung - bass, vocals
 Alexander Hacke - guitar, vocals
 N.U. Unruh - percussion, vocals
 F.M. Einheit - percussion, vocals
with:
 Jim Thirlwell - compilation assistance

References

Einstürzende Neubauten compilation albums
1984 compilation albums
Mute Records compilation albums